Opéra is a station of the Paris Métro, named after the nearby Opéra Garnier, built by architect Charles Garnier. Located at the end of the Avenue de l'Opéra, one of the accesses being opposite the Opéra, it serves the district of Boulevard Haussmann. Three Métro lines (3, 7 and 8) cross each other at one point, known as a "well".

The station offers a connection to the following stations: Auber on RER A, Haussmann–Saint-Lazare on RER E, Havre – Caumartin on Line 3 and Line 9, Saint-Augustin on Line 9, as well as Saint-Lazare on Line 3, Line 12, Line 13 and Line 14. The station is famous for its strong odours of sewers. When it was being built, there were concerns that one of Hector Guimard's characteristic iron metro entrances would spoil the view of the opera house, so a marble entrance was built instead.

Location

The station platforms were established under Rue Auber for line 3; for line 7, under Avenue de l'Opéra; and for line 8, under Boulevard des Capucines; and partially under the Place de l'Opéra.

The three lines cross thanks to a common underground structure located under the square. The station is connected by underground passages with the Gare d'Auber (RER A) and, indirectly with the Havre – Caumartin station, then the Haussmann–Saint-Lazare station (RER E) and the stations Saint-Lazare and Saint-Augustin.

History

The Line 3 platforms opened on 19 October 1904 as part of the first section of the line opened between Père Lachaise and Villiers. A twenty metre high masonry well was built to avoid the need for heavy underpinning work when Line 7 and Line 8 were planned to be built. This work was affected by groundwater, which required the support of three concrete pillars, made by sinking caissons with workers digging out the mud with compressed air. The work lasted eleven months, from March 1903 to February 1904. It owes its name to the Garnier opera house, built by the architect Charles Garnier.

The Line 7 platforms opened on 5 November 1910 as part of the first section of the line opened between Opéra and Porte de la Villette. The Line 8 platforms opened on 13 July 1913 as part of the first section of the line opened between Opéra and Beaugrenelle (now Charles Michels station on Line 10) and then on 30 June 1928 when it was extended to Richelieu - Drouot.

From the 1950s to the 1980s, the walls in line 3 were covered with metal bodywork before their renovation in Andreu-Motte style. The platforms of Lines 7 and 8 were modernised from the early 1970s to 2007 in a unique style with three shades of blue (a dark tone for the Motte style seats and the vault and two others lighter shades for small square tiles). The station's name consisted of large raised white capital letters. This decoration, derived from the Mouton-Duvernet style, from which it notably adopted the characteristic lighting canopies, was sometimes nicknamed the "swimming pool". The blue ceiling was then repainted in white to increase the brightness. The entire layout was removed in 2007 when the station was renovated as part of the RATP Renouveau du métro programme. Only the Saint-Lazare station on Lines 12 and 13 had comparable decoration until the mid-2000s.

On 1 April 2016, the RATP replaced one of every two nameplates on the platforms of the three lines to make an April Fool for a day, like twelve other stations. Opera is humorously renamed "Apéro" by anagram.

In 2019, 10,501,357 travelers entered this station which places it at the 15th position of metro stations for its usage.

Passenger services

Access
The station has three accesses, two of which are on Place de l'Opéra and one on Place Charles-Garnier. In addition, at No. 43 Avenue de l'Opéra there is a simple exit.

Station layout

Platforms

The platforms of the three lines are of standard configuration. Two in number per stopping point, they are separated by the metro tracks located in the centre.

The platform for line 3 is established flush with the walls. The ceiling consists of a metal roof, whose beams, burgundy in colour, are supported by vertical pillars. The decoration is in the Andreu-Motte style with two burgundy light canopies, benches, tunnel exits and walls fitted with large white flat tiles in a stretched sandstone and purple Motte seats. On the other hand, the outlets of the corridors are fitted with standard white bevelled tiles. Advertisements are devoid of frames and the name of the station is written in Parisine font on enamelled plates. With Palais Royal - Musée du Louvre on line 1 and Concorde on line 8, this is one of three stations in the Andreu-Motte style to be treated in shades of purple, this shade being part of the lexicon exceptional colours for this decoration.

The platforms of lines 7 and 8 have an elliptical vault and are similarly arranged, with a slight extra curve for line 7, while the platforms of line 8 have a higher of the vault. The style is that used for most metro stations. The lighting canopies are white and rounded in the Gaudin du renouveau du métro des années 2000 renovation, and the bevelled white ceramic tiles cover the walls and the tympans. The vault is painted white. The advertising frames are in white ceramic and the name of the station is written in Parisine font on enamelled plates. The seats are Akiko style, green for line 7 and orange for line 8. As part of the treatment for major permeation, the lighting canopies for line 7 is temporarily removed.

Bus connections
The station is served by lines 20, 21, 22, 27, 32, 29, 45, 52, 66, 68, 95, the Roissybus and the tourist line OpenTour of the RATP Bus Network and, at night, by lines N15 and N16 of the Noctilien network.

Gallery

References

Paris Métro stations in the 2nd arrondissement of Paris
Paris Métro stations in the 9th arrondissement of Paris
Railway stations in France opened in 1904